Agathotoma ordinaria is a species of sea snail, a marine gastropod mollusk in the family Mangeliidae.

Description
The length of the shell attains 7.5 mm, its diameter 2.5 mm.

The turreted shell has an oblong shape. It contains 7 whorls, of which the first two are smooth and convex. The subsequent whorls are convex and contains 10-11 ribs that hardly stand out from the background and spiral lirae. The aperture is narrow and measures about 2/5 of the total length. The white outer lip is incrassate and on top slightly sinuate. The siphonal canal is short and narrow. The columella is simple.

Distribution
This species occurs in the Pacific Ocean from Peru to Northern Chile.

References

External links
  Tucker, J.K. 2004 Catalog of recent and fossil turrids (Mollusca: Gastropoda). Zootaxa 682:1–1295.
 

ordinaria
Gastropods described in 1882